Willamette Valley Christian High School is a private Christian school in Brooks, Oregon, United States.

The school has been accredited by the Association of Christian Schools International since 1984, and by the Northwest Association of Accredited Schools since 1999.

References

High schools in Marion County, Oregon
Private middle schools in Oregon
Christian schools in Oregon
Private elementary schools in Oregon
Private high schools in Oregon
1967 establishments in Oregon